Miguel Ángel Roig (born 25 June 1921 – 14 July 1989) was an Argentine economist.

He served as Minister of Economy of Argentina for a six days until his death at the beginning of Carlos Menem presidency in 1989.

1921 births
Argentine economists
1989 deaths
Argentine Ministers of Finance